Contagion may refer to:

Medicine
 Contagious disease

Social science
 Emotional contagion, a tendency to feel others' emotions
 Behavioral contagion, a tendency to mimic others' behavior
 Law of contagion, a folk belief related to magical thinking
 Financial contagion, a scenario in which financial shocks spread to other financial sectors
 Hysterical contagion, an effect in which a group exhibits physical symptoms due to a psychological cause
 Sacred contagion, the belief that spiritual properties pass from one entity to another
 Complex contagion, a social networking phenomenon
 Contagion heuristic, a psychological technique

Film and television
 Contagion (1987 film), directed by Karl Zwicky
 Contagion (2002 film), featuring Bruce Boxleitner
 Contagion (2011 film), directed by Steven Soderbergh
 "Contagion" (Star Trek: The Next Generation), 1989 TV episode

Music
 Contagion (Oceano album), 2010
 "Contagion", a song by Black Dahlia Murder on the 2003 album Unhallowed

Other uses
 Contagion (novel), by Robin Cook
 Batman: Contagion, a comic book story arc
 Coded Arms: Contagion, a 2007 video game
 Contagion (video game), a 2014 video game

See also

 
 
 Contagious (disambiguation)